José Luis Brown (10 January 1956 – 12 August 2019) was an Argentine football central defender and coach.

Most of his 14-year professional career was spent with Estudiantes, for which he appeared in more than 300 official matches and won two major titles. He also competed in Colombia, France and Spain.

Nicknamed Tata, Brown represented the Argentina national team at the 1986 World Cup and three Copa América tournaments, winning the former and scoring in the final. In 1995, he began working as a manager.

Playing career

Club
Born in Ranchos, Buenos Aires, Brown spent his first years as a senior with Estudiantes de La Plata, scoring an astonishing 17 goals in a combined 69 matches as the club won the Metropolitano and Nacional in the 1982 and 1983 editions of the Primera División, respectively.

After two years in Colombia with Atlético Nacional, Brown played in quick succession for Boca Juniors and Deportivo Español back in his homeland, moving abroad again in 1986 after signing with Ligue 1 side Stade Brestois 29. The following year he joined Spain's Real Murcia on a two-year contract, making his La Liga debut on 30 August 1987 in a 0–1 away loss against CA Osasuna.

Brown retired from football in late 1989 at the age of 33, after some months with Racing Club de Avellaneda.

International

Brown won 36 caps for Argentina, making his first appearance in 1983. He was selected for the 1983, 1987 and 1989 Copa América tournaments, helping the national team to third place in the latter.

Brown was also picked for the 1986 FIFA World Cup by manager Carlos Bilardo, as a last-minute addition: in spite of a serious knee injury suffered two years earlier that had not still fully healed, he was chosen to start ahead of ageing Daniel Passarella, being informed by the coach on the day before the opener. He went on to play all the games and minutes in Mexico, netting his only international goal, a header in the final against West Germany after a free kick by Jorge Burruchaga (eventual 3–2 win); in the last minutes he dislocated his shoulder, but refused to be substituted.

Coaching career

After retiring, Brown worked as an assistant for different managers, including Oscar Ruggeri at San Lorenzo de Almagro and Bilardo at Boca Juniors. His first head coach experience arrived in 1995 at the helm of lowly Los Andes de Lomas de Zamora, and five years later he was appointed at newly promoted Club Almagro with another former national teammate, Héctor Enrique.

After one season the duo moved to Club Atlético Nueva Chicago, but had to resign after only 11 matches due to poor results. In 2002, Brown was hired by Club Blooming in Bolivia, again being fired early into his tenure.

Brown again reunited with Bilardo in 2003–04, being in charge of Estudiantes' youth sides. In the following years, in quick succession, he was in charge of Atlético de Rafaela, Almagro, Club Sportivo Ben Hur and Club Ferro Carril Oeste.

In December 2007, Brown became coach of the Argentine under-17 team as Sergio Batista was put at the helm of the under-20s. As the latter's assistant at the 2008 Summer Olympics the country won the gold medal, and the pair later joined Diego Maradona's staff at the full side.

Brown led Argentina under-17s to the second place at the 2009 South American Football Championship, with the subsequent qualification to the World Cup of the category, which ended with a round-of-16 exit at the hands of Colombia. In March 2013 he returned to Ferro Carril, with the club still in Primera B Nacional.

Personal life and death
Brown was unrelated to the Scottish family of the same surname that produced six Argentina internationals in the early 20th century.  His son Juan was also a footballer, who played in Argentina and Bolivia.

Brown's club and international manager Bilardo mispronounced his name as Bron, which he never corrected due to his respect towards the man who gave him his debut. He died on 12 August 2019 in La Plata at the age of 62, due to Alzheimer's disease.

Honours

Club
Estudiantes
 Primera División: 1982 Metropolitano, 1983 Nacional

International
Argentina
 FIFA World Cup: 1986

References

External links

1956 births
2019 deaths
People from General Paz Partido
Argentine footballers
Association football defenders
Argentine Primera División players
Estudiantes de La Plata footballers
Boca Juniors footballers
Deportivo Español footballers
Racing Club de Avellaneda footballers
Categoría Primera A players
Atlético Nacional footballers
Ligue 1 players
Stade Brestois 29 players
La Liga players
Real Murcia players
Argentina international footballers
1986 FIFA World Cup players
1983 Copa América players
1987 Copa América players
1989 Copa América players
FIFA World Cup-winning players
Argentine expatriate footballers
Expatriate footballers in Colombia
Expatriate footballers in France
Expatriate footballers in Spain
Argentine expatriate sportspeople in Colombia
Argentine expatriate sportspeople in France
Argentine expatriate sportspeople in Spain
Argentine football managers
Argentine Primera División managers
Almagro managers
Nueva Chicago managers
Atlético de Rafaela managers
Ferro Carril Oeste managers
Club Blooming managers
Argentine expatriate football managers
Expatriate football managers in Bolivia
Argentine expatriate sportspeople in Bolivia
Deaths from dementia in Argentina
Deaths from Alzheimer's disease
Sportspeople from Buenos Aires Province